Kevin Gillespie may refer to:

 Kevin Gillespie (academic), president of Saint Joseph's University
 Kevin Gillespie (comics) (born 1977), American comic book creator and graphic artist
 Kevin Gillespie (chef) (born 1982), American chef
 Kevin Gillespie (Monsignor) (born 1970s), Irish priest